Machimia is a genus of moths of the family Depressariidae described by James Brackenridge Clemens in 1860.

Species
 Machimia aethostola Meyrick, 1931
 Machimia albula Turner, 1946
 Machimia anthracospora Meyrick, 1934
 Machimia caduca Walsingham, 1912
 Machimia chorrera Busck, 1914
 Machimia conspersa Turner, 1946
 Machimia cruda Meyrick, 1926
 Machimia cyphopleura Turner, 1946
 Machimia desertorum Berg, 1875
 Machimia diagrapha Meyrick, 1931
 Machimia dolopis Walsingham, 1912
 Machimia dystheata Turner, 1946
 Machimia eothina Meyrick, 1920
 Machimia guerneella de Joannis, 1914
 Machimia homopolia Turner, 1946
 Machimia ignicolor Busck, 1914
 Machimia illuminella Busck, 1914
 Machimia intaminata Meyrick, 1922
 Machimia metagypsa Turner, 1946
 Machimia miltosparsa Turner, 1914
 Machimia morata Meyrick, 1911
 Machimia neuroscia Meyrick, 1930
 Machimia notella Busck, 1914
 Machimia ochrophanes Turner, 1916
 Machimia oxybela Meyrick, 1931
 Machimia peperita Walsingham, 1912
 Machimia perianthes Meyrick, 1922
 Machimia pyrocalyx Meyrick, 1922
 Machimia pyrograpta Meyrick, 1932
 Machimia rhaphiducha Turner, 1946
 Machimia rogifera Meyrick, 1914
 Machimia sejunctella Walker, 1864
 Machimia serva Meyrick, 1920
 Machimia tentoriferella Clemens, 1860
 Machimia trigama Meyrick, 1928
 Machimia trunca Meyrick, 1930

Former species
 Machimia absumptella Walker, 1864
 Machimia achroa Turner, 1896
 Machimia agglomerata Meyrick, 1920
 Machimia alma Meyrick, 1914
 Machimia amata Meyrick, 1914
 Machimia anaemica Turner, 1916
 Machimia analis Busck, 1914
 Machimia ancorata Walsingham, 1912
 Machimia atripunctatella Turner, 1896
 Machimia baliosticha Turner, 1946
 Machimia biseriata Meyrick, 1920
 Machimia brachytricha Turner, 1927
 Machimia brevicilia Turner, 1946
 Machimia caminodes Turner, 1916
 Machimia carella Walker, 1864
 Machimia carnea Zeller, 1855
 Machimia cholodella Meyrick, 1883
 Machimia coccinea Turner, 1917
 Machimia coccoscela Turner, 1946
 Machimia costimacula Meyrick, 1883
 Machimia crossota Walsingham, 1912
 Machimia crucifera Busck, 1914
 Machimia cryptorrhoda Turner, 1946
 Machimia cuphosema Turner, 1946
 Machimia cylicotypa Turner, 1946
 Machimia defessa Meyrick, 1920
 Machimia delosticta Turner, 1946
 Machimia ebenosticta Turner, 1946
 Machimia eoxantha Turner, 1896
 Machimia epicosma Turner, 1916
 Machimia erythema Walsingham, 1912
 Machimia eubrocha Turner, 1946
 Machimia fervida Zeller, 1855
 Machimia flava Zeller, 1839
 Machimia habroschema Turner, 1946
 Machimia haploceros Turner, 1946
 Machimia hebes Turner, 1946
 Machimia holochra Turner, 1946
 Machimia incensatella Walker, 1864
 Machimia interjecta Turner, 1946
 Machimia lera Turner, 1946
 Machimia leucerythra Meyrick, 1883
 Machimia limbata Meyrick, 1883
 Machimia loxomita Turner, 1946
 Machimia marcella Busck, 1914
 Machimia mesogaea Turner, 1916
 Machimia metaxantha Turner, 1946
 Machimia metriopis Meyrick, 1887
 Machimia micromita Turner, 1946
 Machimia microptera Turner, 1916
 Machimia miltosticha Turner, 1946
 Machimia mitescens Meyrick, 1914
 Machimia moderatella Walker, 1864
 Machimia mollis Turner, 1946
 Machimia myodes Meyrick, 1883
 Machimia neochlora Meyrick, 1883
 Machimia nephospila Turner, 1946
 Machimia notatana Walker, 1863
 Machimia notoporphyra Turner, 1946
 Machimia ochra Turner, 1946
 Machimia oncospila Turner, 1946
 Machimia pastea Turner, 1927
 Machimia phaenopis Turner, 1916
 Machimia picturata Turner, 1946
 Machimia platyporphyra Turner, 1946
 Machimia porphyraspis Turner, 1896
 Machimia praepedita Meyrick, 1920
 Machimia pseudota Lower, 1901
 Machimia pudica Zeller, 1855
 Machimia pyrrhopasta Turner, 1946
 Machimia pyrrhoxantha Meyrick, 1931
 Machimia repandula Zeller, 1855
 Machimia restricta Meyrick, 1920
 Machimia rhodopepla Lower, 1903
 Machimia rhoecozona Turner, 1946
 Machimia roseomarginella Busck, 1911
 Machimia rubella Turner, 1938
 Machimia rufa Meyrick, 1883
 Machimia rufescens Turner, 1946
 Machimia rufimaculella Turner, 1896
 Machimia sarcoxantha Lower, 1893
 Machimia sericata Meyrick, 1883
 Machimia similis Turner, 1946
 Machimia sobriella Walker, 1864
 Machimia stenomorpha Turner, 1946
 Machimia stenorrhoda Turner, 1946
 Machimia stygnodes Turner, 1946
 Machimia styphlodes Turner, 1946
 Machimia submissa Turner, 1946
 Machimia sulphurea Busck, 1914
 Machimia teratopa Meyrick, 1920
 Machimia umbratica Turner, 1946
 Machimia vestalis Zeller, 1873
 Machimia zatrephes Turner, 1916
 Machimia zelota Turner, 1916

References

 
Depressariinae